Sat Sri Akaal (Gurumukhi ਸਤਿ ਸ੍ਰੀ ਅਕਾਲ) is a Jaikara (lit. Call of Victory) now used, often, as a greeting by Punjabi Sikhs. It is the second half of the Sikh Clarion call, given by the Tenth guru, Guru Gobind Singh, "Bole So Nihal, Sat Sri Akal" (Shout Aloud in Ecstasy. Truth is the Timeless One).

Meaning
Sat is Punjabi word , which means truth. Sri is a honorific used across various Indian Subcontinent languages. Akaal is made up of the Punjabi word Kal, meaning time, and the prefix a- which is used in various Indian languages as a way to make a word into its antonym, so Akal means timeless.

Usage
Besides being the clarion call of Sikhism, the Jaikara has become an integral part of the Sikh liturgy and is spoken at the end of Ardas, the Sikh prayer in holy congregations.

The usage of Sat Shri Akaal as a greeting, although used by the majority of people who identify themselves as being Sikh, is regarded as incorrect usage by "Amritdhari [baptized] Sikhs. As the term is historically the second half of the Sikh war cry, "Bole So Nihal, Sat Shri Akal", and is still used in the same way. As per the Sikh Rehat Maryada, or Code of Conduct, Amritdhari Sikhs greet each other with "Waheguru Ji Ka Khalsa Waheguru Ji Ki Fateh", meaning "The Khalsa  belongs to the Lord God! The victory belongs to God!".

Defense battle cry 
Three regiments of the Indian Army – the Punjab Regiment, Sikh Regiment, and Sikh Light Infantry – use it as their battle cry.

See also 

 Bole So Nihal
 Khalsa bole

References

Greeting words and phrases of India
Sikh terminology